Temnora turlini is a moth of the  family Sphingidae from Rwanda.

The wingspan is 50–52 mm. It is immediately distinguishable from all other Temnora species by the narrow diffuse pinkish-white band running from a point on the costa (two-thirds from the base) almost perpendicularly to the tornus. This band separates a dark brown basal area of the wing from a paler brown distal zone.

References

Temnora
Lepidoptera of Rwanda
Moths described in 1975
Moths of Africa